Charlton railway station is a railway station in Charlton, Royal Borough of Greenwich. The station is operated by Southeastern. Trains serving the station are operated by Southeastern and Thameslink. It is in Travelcard Zone 3.

Charlton station is within walking distance of The Valley, home of Charlton Athletic F.C. It was first opened in 1849 by the South Eastern Railway on the North Kent Line and is close to the junction where the routes via  and  converge (the link from Greenwich and  being completed in 1878).

Services 

The typical off-peak service in trains per hour is:
 4 tph to London Cannon Street (2 of these run via  and 2 run via )
 2 tph to  via Greenwich 
 2 tph to 
 2 tph to  via 

During the peak hours, the station is served by an additional half-hourly circular service to and from London Cannon Street via  and Lewisham in the clockwise direction and via Greenwich in the anticlockwise direction.

Connections 
London Buses routes 161, 177, 180, 472, 486 and night route N1 serve the station.

References

External links 

Railway stations in the Royal Borough of Greenwich
Former South Eastern Railway (UK) stations
Railway stations in Great Britain opened in 1849
Railway stations served by Southeastern
Railway station
1849 establishments in England
Railway stations served by Govia Thameslink Railway